











































Lists of country codes